The New Zealand women's cricket team toured South Africa in 1971–72, playing three Test matches.  New Zealand won the series 1–0, with two drawn Tests.

Test series

1st Test

2nd Test

3rd Test

Tour matches
New Zealand played six matches, coming against:

References

Women's international cricket tours of South Africa
1972 in New Zealand cricket
1972 in South African cricket
International cricket competitions from 1970–71 to 1975
South African cricket seasons from 1970–71 to 1999–2000
Women 1972
February 1972 sports events in Africa
March 1972 sports events in Africa
1972 in women's cricket